George Daniel Lanphear (January 24, 1938 – March 23, 2018) was an American football player. He was born in Madison, Wisconsin, and played college football for the University of Wisconsin–Madison. He was a member of the 1959 Wisconsin Badgers football team that lost to the Washington Huskies in the 1960 Rose Bowl. He later played in the American Football League (AFL) for the Houston Oilers in 1960 and 1962 as a defensive end. Lanphear was also drafted in the eighth round of the 1960 NFL Draft by the Pittsburgh Steelers. He played 14 games for the Oilers in 1960, winning an AFL title with the team. He played two games in the 1962 season. Lanphear died in 2018 at the age of 80.

References

1938 births
2018 deaths
American football defensive ends
Houston Oilers players
Wisconsin Badgers football players
All-American college football players
Sportspeople from Madison, Wisconsin
Players of American football from Wisconsin
American Football League players
Madison West High School alumni